Halieutopsis galatea, also known as Galathea deepsea batfish, is a species of fish in the family Ogcocephalidae.

It is found in the Western Indian Ocean off the coast of Kenya.

Etymology
The fish is named for the vessel Galathea.

References

Ogcocephalidae
Marine fish genera
Fish described in 1988
Taxa named by Margaret G. Bradbury